WMTI (1160 AM) is a radio station broadcasting a News Talk Information format. It is licensed to Barceloneta–Manatí, Puerto Rico, and serves the Puerto Rico area. The station is owned by Wilfredo G. Blanco-Pi and is part of the Borinquen Radio News Network. The station is rebroadcast by FM translator W287DR 105.3 FM, also in Barceloneta-Manatí.

The station was assigned the WBQN call letters by the Federal Communications Commission on January 24, 1974. It began broadcasting in March 1975 and was originally owned by Ángel Rivera. The station changed its call sign to WAPA on May 27, 2022, to WISO on June 10, 2022, and then to WMTI on June 24, 2022.

Translator

Note

References

External links
FCC History Cards for WMTI

 

Radio stations established in 1976
News and talk radio stations in Puerto Rico
1976 establishments in Puerto Rico
Manatí, Puerto Rico
Barceloneta, Puerto Rico